Kendig is a German surname. Notable people with the surname include:

Isabelle Kendig, American clinical psychologist
Marjorie Kendig (1892–1981), American administrator
W. Dennis Kendig (1880–1948), American politician

German-language surnames